The Quadrangle (Spanish: El Cuadrángulo) is the heart and main quadrangle of the University of Puerto Rico, Río Piedras. Together with the Roosevelt Tower (La Torre), it is listed on the National Register of Historic Places as the University of Puerto Rico Tower and The Quadrangle, for its unique history which represents the union between Puerto Rican architecture with the Jeffersonian Neoclassical style often seen in American universities. It is famous for its lines of Puerto Rican royal palm (Roystonea borinquena) or palma real and the architecture of its surrounding buildings.

The Quadrangle was designed by Puerto Rican architect Rafael Carmoega. The University of Puerto Rico Theater was first built on its eastern edge in 1939.

The Quadrangle is the largest courtyard space in the University of Puerto Rico, Río Piedras campus. It is surrounding by buildings currently used by the University of Puerto Rico Administration and the College of Humanities. Its two most notable landmarks are the University Tower located on the western edge of the quad, and the University of Puerto Rico Theater, also known as the Roosevelt Theater, on its eastern edge. These buildings have an architectural style combining Spanish Revival styles such as Andalusian/Spanish Gothic and Baroque Revival. There is also a Banco Popular branch office and additional auditoriums.

See also 
 La Torre, officially known in English as Roosevelt Tower
 University and college buildings listed on the National Register of Historic Places

References 

National Register of Historic Places in San Juan, Puerto Rico
University of Puerto Rico, Río Piedras Campus
Squares in Puerto Rico
University and college buildings on the National Register of Historic Places in Puerto Rico
1935 establishments in Puerto Rico
Spanish Revival architecture in Puerto Rico